Sweetland is an unincorporated community in Lincoln County, West Virginia, United States. Sweetland had a post office, which closed on December 14, 1996.

The community was named after one Mr. Van Sweetland.

References

Unincorporated communities in Lincoln County, West Virginia
Unincorporated communities in West Virginia